Uti Petelo is an American Samoan politician and member of the American Samoa Senate.

Petelo is from Leloaloa, American Samoa. He was elected to the Senate following the death of Faumuina Tagisialii. At the 2016 election chiefs were unable to reach a consensus on who should fill the seat, resulting in Tilo Vasaga Tilo being elected by lot. He was re-elected to the Senate at the 2020 election.

References

Living people
People from Eastern District, American Samoa
American Samoan politicians
American Samoa Senators
Year of birth missing (living people)